Nationalisms in Valencia may refer to:

 Valencian and/or Catalan nationalism 
 Spanish nationalism